Swann Arlaud (born 30 November 1981) is a French actor. He has appeared in films such as Romantics Anonymous (2010), Les Anarchistes (2015), The Wakhan Front (2015) and Baden Baden (2016).

Career
In 2020 Arlaud won the César Award for Best Supporting Actor for playing a child sex abuse survivor in By the Grace of God.

Filmography

As actor

As filmmaker

Theatre

References

External links

 

1981 births
Living people
French male film actors
French male television actors
French male stage actors
21st-century French male actors
Male actors from Paris
Best Actor César Award winners
Best Supporting Actor César Award winners